"Here and Now" is a 1989 song by American recording artist Luther Vandross, and written by: David L. Elliott, Terry Steele, and Charles “Casino“ White. The single is from the compilation album The Best of Luther Vandross... The Best of Love.  "Here and Now" became his fifth single to peak at No. 1 on the Hot Black Singles, and his first single to chart in the top ten on the Billboard Hot 100, peaking at No. 6.

Critical reception
David Giles from Music Week wrote, "Vandross diehards will happily lap this up — it's already put in a showing in the lower reaches of the chart — but this typically dreamy, sensual ballad hardly represents a quantum leap in style for the romantic soul maestro."

Charts

Weekly charts

Year-end charts

Certifications

Accolades
"Here and Now" also earned Vandross his first Grammy Award for Best Male R&B Vocal Performance in 1991.

Popular Culture
Vandross performed the song on an episode of The Oprah Winfrey Show 
Vandross also performed the song in the two-part "Do Not Pass Go" (season 5) of 227, where he performed during Rose and Warren's wedding ceremony in early 1990.

Renditions 
In 1997, saxophonist Richard Elliot covered the song on the soprano saxophone for his album "Jumpin' Off."

References

1989 singles
1990 singles
Luther Vandross songs
Contemporary R&B ballads
1989 songs
Epic Records singles
Soul ballads
1980s ballads